Suure-Rakke may refer to several places in Estonia:

Suure-Rakke, Lääne-Viru County, village in Rakke Parish, Lääne-Viru County
Suure-Rakke, Tartu County, village in Rannu Parish, Tartu County